Allithiamine (thiamine allyl disulfide or TAD) is a lipid-soluble form of vitamin B1 which was discovered in garlic (Allium sativum) in the 1950s along with its homolog prosultiamine. They were both investigated for their ability to treat Wernicke–Korsakoff syndrome and beriberi better than thiamine.

See also 
 Vitamin B1 analogue

References 

Alkene derivatives
Formamides
Organic disulfides
Pyrimidines
Thiamine
Allyl compounds